Drink Hunters is a Catalan band from Barcelona and surroundings. Their music is a mix of punk rock, hardcore punk, folk music and Celtic music with traditional melodies and musical instruments like tin whistle and fiddle. This musical style is commonly called Celtic punk or folk punk. Their lyrics, sung in English, talk about social criticism, diverse historical events, and drinking and partying.

History
Drink Hunters was created in 2008 in Barcelona. Aaron (lead vocals and bassist) and Pau (drums and vocals) chose the Celtic punk way after some music projects. They mentioned it to Raja (guitarist and vocals), and then they looked for musicians who play traditional instruments to complete their punk rock mixed with Irish folk influences. They called Rosa (accordion) and Nando (fiddle) for that.

In January 2010, they recorded their first EP, a self-produced demo. During that same year, they signed with their first label Discos Rayados. They also appeared on Whiskey Devils a tribute to The Mahones covering The Mahones' song called "Take no Prisoners".

In 2011, With my Crew (first album of the band) appeared on the Celtic punk scene. It was well received by the public and by critics. This was soon followed by many concerts around Catalonia and Spain.

In March 2012, they took part in the Paddy Rock compilation (Paddy Rock Vol. 4), providing the song "With my Crew" and sharing this appearance with other bands as The Rumjacks and The Mahones.

In September 2014, they released their newest album called Lurking Behind the Woods, which was later shown on their first European tour crossing France, Italy, Germany, Slovakia and Czech Republic.
That year, they also released their first clip of the song of their new album "The Big Fella".
Drink Hunters has shared the stage with bands like: The Real Mckenzies, Mad Caddies, Pipes and Pints, The Dreadnoughts, La Plebe, Blowfuse, Freygolo, Bastards on Parade, Skontra, and Brutus Daughters, among others.

Members

Current
 Pau Arbonés: drums, vocals
 Aaron Del Pino: bass guitar, lead vocals
 Daniel Raja: electric guitar, vocals
 
 Biel Romaní: fiddle

Former
 Rosa Ramon: accordion

Discography
 I love whisky I love beer - demo, 2009
 Drinking Song
 It's in your hands
 Warrior Souls
 In my Head

 With my Crew - album, 2012
 Welcome to Happiness
 It's in your hands
 I don't need you
 Fucking cops
 All night drunk
 With my Crew
 Drinking Song
 Scum
 In your paradise
 She was
 In my head
 Warriors Souls
 Molly never sleeps alone

 Lurking behind the Woods - album, 2014
 Intro: Lurking behind the Woods
 Speciecism
 Breogan's Descendents
 Party at Paul's house
 Speak more than a Fucking Politician
 The Big Fella
 Kill the King
 The Hunter Song
 Rolling Down
 Just Tomorrow
 Second Chance
 The Same Story
 Stupid Trends
 Nasty Dictator

Collaborations
 Whiskey Devils a tribute to The Mahones (Whiskey Devils Records, 2010)
 6. Take no Prisoners
 Paddy Rock Vol. 4 (Paddy Rock, 2012)
 21. With my Crew

References

External links
 Bandcamp page
 [http://www.wakesound.com/entrevista-a-drink-hunters-creemos-que-el-celtic-punk-saca-el-espiritu-alegre-y-luchador-que-llevamos-dentro/ Drink Hunters interview in Wakesound Magazine Spanish
 "Lurking behind the Woods" review from The Celtic Crier

Celtic punk groups
Spanish punk rock groups